Swati Chitnis (1958/1959) is an Indian Bollywood actress who works in both the film and television industry. She is currently playing the Pivotal Role of Suhasini Goenka (Kartik's Grandmother,Akshara's Great-Grandmother and Abhir's Great-Great-Grandmother) in Star Plus's Longest Soap Opera Yeh Rishta Kya Kehlata Hai.

Chitnis has appeared in films such as Shubhamangal Savadhan and Hee Porgi Kunachi.  She later appeared in television shows such as Laagi Tujhse Lagan, Bhai Bhaiya Aur Brother. She also appeared in Star Plus's series Iss Pyaar Ko Kya Naam Doon?, where she played Dadi (Subhudra / Sumi), Arnav's Paternal Mother (grandmother).

Filmography
Ventilator (2016) as Indu
Lagna Pahave Karun as Nalini Dixit
Rajjo (2013) as Ammi
Road to Sangam (2010) as Aara

Shubha Mangal Saavadhan (2006)
Hee Porgi Kunachi (2006) as Mrs. Deshmukh
Jungle (2000) as Mrs. Malhotra

TV serials 
Yeh Rishta Kya Kehlata Hai (2016–present) as Suhasini Goenka
Bhai Bhaiya Aur Brother (2012) as Jamuna Mahendra Chawla
Iss Pyaar Ko Kya Naam Doon? (2012) as Subhadra Devi (Dadi/Sumi)
Laagi Tujhse Lagan (2009-2012) as Aayi Sahib
Sasural Simar Ka (2013) as Shobha
Mitwa Phool Kamal Ke (2009-2010) as Mahaviri
Jasuben Jayantilaal Joshi Ki Joint Family (2008-2009) as Jasumati Jayantilaal Joshi
Paltan (TV series 1997)
Avantika as Ratna
Kudrat as Mrs. Chaudhary

References

External links

Living people
Actresses in Hindi cinema
Indian film actresses
Indian voice actresses
Year of birth missing (living people)